Treasury Building may refer to:

 Treasury Building, Adelaide, in Victoria Square, Adelaide
Treasury Building, Brisbane,  Australia
Old Treasury Building, Melbourne,  Australia
Treasury Building, Sydney, Australia
Treasury Building (Washington, D.C.), United States
Treasury Building (Dublin), Republic of Ireland